Golden Leroy Sunkett Jr. (March 28, 1918 – May 9, 1993), nicknamed "Pete", was an American Negro league pitcher in the 1940s.

A native of Melfa, Virginia, Sunkett played for the Philadelphia Stars from 1943 to 1945. Following his baseball career, he served as a police detective in Camden, New Jersey. Sunkett died in Cherry Hill, New Jersey in 1993 at age 75.

References

External links
 and Baseball-Reference Black Baseball stats and Seamheads

1918 births
1993 deaths
Philadelphia Stars players
Baseball pitchers
Baseball players from Virginia
People from Accomack County, Virginia
20th-century African-American sportspeople